The 1994–95 Czech 1.liga season was the second season of the Czech 1.liga, the second level of ice hockey in the Czech Republic. Fourteen teams participated in the league, and HC Kometa Brno and HC Železárny Třinec were directly promoted to the Czech Extraliga.

Regular season

Playoffs

Playoff qualification 
 HC Baník Hodonín – HC Prostějov 2:1 (3:5, 4:1, 5:2)
 H + S Beroun HC – IHC Písek 2:1 (4:1, 3:5, 3:1)
 HC Slezan Opava – BK Havlíčkův Brod 2:0 (2:1, 3:0)
 HC Lev Hradec Králové – HC Slovan Ústí nad Labem 0:2 (2:5, 1:3)

Quarterfinals 
 HC Kometa Brno – HC Slovan Ústí nad Labem 3:1 (8:3, 3:0, 0:4, 6:3)
 HC Železáři Třinec – HC Slezan Opava 3:0 (5:3, 13:2, 2:0)
 TJ Slovan Jindřichův Hradec – HC Beroun 3:1 (2:3, 7:5, 3:2, 3:1)
 AZ Havířov – HC Baník Hodonín 3:0 (3:1, 4:2, 4:3)

Semifinals 
 HC Kometa Brno – AZ Havířov 3:0 (6:3, 5:0, 3:1)
 HC Železárny Třinec – TJ Slovan Jindřichův Hradec 3:0 (8:0, 4:2, 3:2)

HC Kometa Brno and HC Oceláři Třinec have been directly promoted to the Czech Extraliga.

Relegation 

HC Tábor has been relegated to the Czech 2. Liga.

External links
 Season on hockeyarchives.info

2
Czech
Czech 1. Liga seasons